Kilishi is a version of jerky that originated in Hausaland specifically Niger . It is a dried form of suya, made from  cow, sheep or goat meat.

Ingredients:

 1 kg beef

 1/2 teaspoon of garlic powder
 1/2 teaspoon of cloves powder
 Pinch of ginger powder
 2 seasoning cubes
 Pinch of salt
 1/2 paprika
 2 tablespoon of suya spice
 1/3 cup of oil
 Spices

Meat

Firstly, remove the bone from the cow, sheep or goat meat, Each of the selected muscles is sliced into sheets of one metre or less for easy drying. The dried sheets of meat are then collected and kept for the next process.

Labu

A paste made from peanuts, called labu, is prepared by diluting with water. Spices, salt, ground onions, and sometimes sweeteners such as honey are added for flavor. A more natural way to add sweetness is with date palm.  The dried "sheets" of meat are then immersed one by one in the labu paste to coat them, before being left to dry for hours.

Roasting

After drying, the meat roasted on a wire mesh. Kilishi originates mainly from the northern part of Nigeria and the northern part of Cameroon. Kilishi was born out of necessity, to preserve meat for longer as the lean meat supplies protein enough for merchants traveling through the Sahara for trade.

Kilishi can be kept for months without much change in its taste. It is a form of delicacy

References

See also 

 List of dried foods

Dried meat
Chadian cuisine
Nigerian cuisine
Foods
Hausa
Africa